The  New York Giants season was the franchise's 24th season in the National Football League.

Regular season

Schedule

Standings

See also
List of New York Giants seasons

References

New York Giants seasons
New York Giants
1948 in sports in New York City
1940s in Manhattan
Washington Heights, Manhattan